Kevin S. Masters (born 1958) is a Professor of Psychology at the University of Colorado Denver. Since 2009, he has been editor-in-chief of the Journal of Behavioral Medicine, where he was earlier an associate editor (2005–2009). He has also served as associate editor at Annals of Behavioral Medicine (2009–2011). and is currently the Editor-in-Chief of Annals of Behavioral Medicine.

Masters has published numerous articles on the health effects and correlates of religion and spirituality.

Biography
Masters was born in 1958. He obtained his baccalaureate degree in psychology in 1980 from Cedarville College, (BA, 1980), later obtaining graduate degrees in clinical psychology from the University of Dayton, (MA, 1982) and Brigham Young University (PhD, 1989). His doctoral thesis focused on why people run the marathon.

Publications (selected)
Spirituality, religion, and health:

Other:

References

External links
Faculty page

Living people
Psychologists of religion
Brigham Young University alumni
Cedarville University alumni
University of Dayton alumni
Academic journal editors
1958 births
American clinical psychologists